Ludwig Jetzinger (2 August 1892 – 3 August 1985) was an Austrian footballer. He played in two matches for the Austria national football team in 1915.

References

External links
 

1892 births
1985 deaths
Austrian footballers
Austria international footballers
Place of birth missing
Association footballers not categorized by position